The Palace Theatre is an historic theatre in Georgetown, Texas, United States. It is part of the Williamson County Courthouse Historic District.

The theatre was ranked the best live entertainment venue in the Austin American-Statesman 2017 "Best of Georgetown" list.

References

External links
 
 

Buildings and structures in Georgetown, Texas
Theatres in Texas